Vogeltown is a suburb of New Plymouth, in the western North Island of New Zealand. It is located to the southeast of the city centre and east of Frankleigh Park. The suburb was named after Sir Julius Vogel, Prime Minister of New Zealand in the 1870s.

Demographics

Vogeltown had a population of 5,610 at the 2018 New Zealand census, an increase of 606 people (12.1%) since the 2013 census, and an increase of 789 people (16.4%) since the 2006 census. There were 2,286 households, comprising 2,646 males and 2,961 females, giving a sex ratio of 0.89 males per female, with 1,107 people (19.7%) aged under 15 years, 894 (15.9%) aged 15 to 29, 2,490 (44.4%) aged 30 to 64, and 1,119 (19.9%) aged 65 or older.

Ethnicities were 88.1% European/Pākehā, 13.0% Māori, 2.2% Pacific peoples, 4.7% Asian, and 2.4% other ethnicities. People may identify with more than one ethnicity.

The percentage of people born overseas was 18.2, compared with 27.1% nationally.

Although some people chose not to answer the census's question about religious affiliation, 52.4% had no religion, 35.8% were Christian, 0.4% had Māori religious beliefs, 0.8% were Hindu, 0.4% were Muslim, 0.4% were Buddhist and 2.3% had other religions.

Of those at least 15 years old, 960 (21.3%) people had a bachelor's or higher degree, and 816 (18.1%) people had no formal qualifications. 774 people (17.2%) earned over $70,000 compared to 17.2% nationally. The employment status of those at least 15 was that 2,043 (45.4%) people were employed full-time, 660 (14.7%) were part-time, and 174 (3.9%) were unemployed.

Education
Vogeltown School is a contributing primary (years 1–6) school with a roll of  students. The school was established in temporary premises in July 1915 and moved to its own site in May 1919.

Both schools are coeducational. Rolls are as of

Notes

Further reading

Churches

Methodist

School

Suburbs of New Plymouth